The Dominica Trade Union (DTU) is a trade union in Dominica. Founded in 1945 by Emmanuel Christopher Loblack, the DTU has declined from a membership of 8000 down to several hundred members. It is affiliated with the International Trade Union Confederation.

References

Trade unions in Dominica
International Trade Union Confederation
1945 establishments in Dominica
Trade unions established in 1945